Seaton House is the largest homeless shelter in Toronto, Ontario, Canada. It is located at 339 George Street in the Garden District neighbourhood. The facility provides temporary lodging, food, clothing, medical care, for single men and also attempts to provide tools for enabling them to establish their independence. The shelter houses up to 700 men though, in the past, it has exceeded capacity and housed as many as 900 men. It is expected to close in 2020.

Origins
The original Seaton House was built in 1931 at 320 Seaton Street in a -storey building, during the Great Depression, to provide a place to sleep and meals for transient men seeking work. The facility moved to its current premises in 1959.

Facilities and regulations
There is room for 484 men in the main facility. 54 men are housed in the adjacent O'Neill House, a program for new refugees. During hot or cold weather alerts this facility is expanded to provide additional emergency shelter. An additional 110 men are housed in the Seaton House Annex through the Annex/Infirmary Harm Reduction Program. Until the 1990s, the shelter operated on a highly regimented basis imposing a series of rules and regulations including a ban on alcohol and requiring men to get out of bed by 5:15 am. A review of the shelter in the early 1990s was prompted by complaints of staff brutality and authoritarian regulations at the facility. Rules into the 1990s included a requirement to register for a bed by 1:30 pm. The hostel itself did not open until 4 pm and returning clients were expected to provide proof that they applied for at least three jobs during the day, the doors were locked at midnight and clients were expected to be in bed an hour earlier. Lights would go on at 5 am; breakfast was served at 5:30 am and 6:30 am and clients had to leave the premises by 7:30 am. Clients were expected to spend their days looking for work.

Seaton House provides bathing facilities, delousing, a barber, laundry and lockers as well as counselling and life skills training. Typically, a client will sleep in a large room with several bunk beds and shared bathroom. Three meals a day are provided. Clothing and shoes are available, if needed, as well as medical care from doctors and nurses.

Satellite residences are operated at the Birchmount Residence in Scarborough for men over 55 and at Downsview Dell in North York for men who have agreed to abstain from drugs and alcohol and attend treatment.

Funded by the provincial and city governments, the institution now operates on a 24-hour basis.

Clientele
Over the years, the clientele changed from unemployed transients looking for what little work they could find to a population composed largely of men who have complex health, mental health and substance use issues as well as the disabled, refugees and others lacking family or community support have also ended up seeking temporary respite at Seaton House. In 1999, a sudden influx of Tibetan refugees resulted in 53 of them being provided temporary residence at Seaton House. In 2002, several youths from Uganda who arrived in Toronto to participate in the Catholic Church's World Youth Day were housed in Seaton House after they requested asylum.

Harm reduction
Since 1997, the shelter has operated the Seaton House Annex Harm Reduction Program, a "wet shelter" operated in conjunction with staff from St. Michael's Hospital on the harm reduction principle. Previously, Seaton House banned alcohol forcing many homeless alcoholics to stay on the street using unsafe sources of liquor such as rubbing alcohol, cleaners, and industrial products. Under the new "managed alcohol" policy, alcohol-dependent clients enrolled in the program are served one five-ounce pour of wine every 90 minutes until it is determined that an individual is too inebriated, at which point he is denied another drink. The clients have been found to gradually reduce their intake under this regime and many have quit entirely.

The 110 beds in the annex are reserved for homeless chronic alcoholics. According to Dr. Tomislav Svoboda, a family physician attached to the program, it was opened as a result of the outcry that followed the deaths of three homeless alcoholics in the winter of 1995. Until then, welfare regulations prohibited alcoholics from receiving benefits. According to Svoboda, "The poor in Toronto essentially lived in prohibition. Many individuals were forced to make a decision between shelter and use of a substance." A coroner's inquest into the three deaths recommended the creation of a wet shelter.

After the introduction of the program, a study, published in the Canadian Medical Association Journal in 2006 found that serving chronic street alcoholics controlled doses of alcohol also reduced their overall alcohol consumption. Researchers found that program participants cut their alcohol use from an average of 48 drinks a day when they entered the program to an average of 8 drinks and that their trips to hospital emergency rooms drop to an average of eight a month from 13.5 while encounters with the police fall to an average of 8.8 from 18.1.

Relations with neighbourhood
Seaton House is blamed by some Cabbagetown residents for contributing to the deterioration of George Street and the surrounding area. The stretch of George Street between Dundas Street and Gerrard Street where Seaton House is located has been dubbed "crack alley" by neighbours. Community members allege that Seaton House does not properly supervise its residents who, they claim, can be seen on the street outside the facility dealing and smoking crack cocaine. Toronto's director of hostel services rejects the charge of neglect saying that Seaton House and the city "work closely with Toronto Police Services to address the issue of drug dealers who may prey on the men that use the Seaton House program."  Most of the issues on George Street have nothing to do with the men who are residing at Seaton House.

Redevelopment
In late 2009, Toronto City Council initially approved a plan to redevelop Seaton House in partnership with Spike Capital Corp., Kearns Mancini Architects and others who own properties around the shelter, on George Street. The plan would have seen the demolition of the current facility and the transformation of the street into a mix of commercial buildings, affordable housing, student rental properties and a redesigned shelter.

The demolition of Seaton House was approved by City Council in 2013, with a new plan to replace the facility with a smaller one that would provide 100 emergency shelter spaces, 378 long term care beds and 130 assisted living units along with affordable housing. The city estimates that 200 of the facility's current clients will be accommodated in the new project but 400 will require permanent relocation. As of June 2017, the closure of Seaton House has been delayed as $475 million of the redevelopment's estimated total cost of $562 million still needs to be provided and new shelter space still needs to be found for the building's 634 current occupants. The city is now aiming to decommission the facility on May 31, 2020 and begin demolition in June.

In November 2020 Mayor John Tory announced an initiative to revitalize George Street, from Moss Park, to Allan Gardens, that included replacing the current Seaton House facility with a larger and more modern facility, that included long-term care facilities.

References

Homeless shelters in Canada
Organizations based in Toronto
Organizations established in 1931
Homelessness in Canada